Fredheim is a surname. Notable people with the surname include:

Daniel Fredheim Holm (born 1985), Norwegian footballer and coach
Kjell Magne Fredheim (1928–2006), Norwegian politician
Kris Fredheim (born 1987), Canadian ice hockey player
Tor-Arne Fredheim (born 1962), Swedish football player and manager